Lotta & Christer is a Lotta Engberg & Christer Sjögren studio album. It was released in 2012.

Track listing

Contributors
Leif Ottebrand, Patrik Ehlersson – arrangement, production (track 2, 4, 6, 8, 9, 11)
Lennart Sjöholm (track 3, 5, 7, 10, 12), Lars Diedricson (1) – arrangement, production
Torgny Söderberg – co-arrangement ("Tro på mig")
Anders Engberg – wind-arrangement ("Utekväll")
Martin Lindqvist – saxophone-arrangement ("Världens lyckligaste tjej")
Johan Franzon, Mårgan Höglund, Bengan Andersson – drums
Michael Engström, Tobias Gabrielsson, Thomas Lindberg – bass
Leif Ottebrand, Peter Ljung, Lennart Sjöholm, Curt-Eric Holmquist, Anders Lundquist, Lars Diedricson – keyboard
Mats Johansson, Lasse Wellander, Mats Jenséus, Patrik Ehlersson, Per Strandberg, Johan Randén – guitar
Magnus Johansson – trumpet
Peter Johansson – trombone
Tomas Jansson, Wojtek Goral, Martin Lindqvist – woodwind
Pierre Eriksson – accordion
Dieter Schöning, Viveca Rydén Mårtensson, Mats Wulfson – strings
Lotta Engberg, Anneli Axelsson, Erik Mjönes , Per Strandberg, Malin Engberg, Lennart Sjöholm , Carl Utbult, Jaana Vähämäki , Peter Larsson – background singing
Recording – Studio Gallskrik, Bohus Sound Studios, Park Studio
Patrik Ehlersson, Leif Ottebrand – engineer
Tobias Lindell, Bohus Stound Studio – mixing
Bernard Löhr, Mono Music Studio – mixing ("Don't Let Me Down")
Dragan Tanasković, Bohus Stound Studio – mixing
Peter Knutsson – photo
Helene Norberg – hair and makeup
Anders Bühlund, Forma – design

Charts

References

2012 albums
Christer Sjögren albums
Lotta Engberg albums
Collaborative albums